Rick Steves' Europe is an American travel documentary television program created and hosted by Rick Steves. In each episode, he travels to the continent of Europe, documenting his experiences along the way.

The show is produced by Oregon Public Broadcasting and distributed by American Public Television. It premiered on September 3, 2000; since then a total of 11 seasons and 137 episodes have been produced and broadcast in syndication.

Season 10's filming began in September 2017, and it began airing on October 6, 2018 with an hour-long special about Mediterranean cruises that aired in February 2019.

Episodes

Season 1 (2000)

Season 2 (2002)

Season 3 (2004)

Season 4 (2006)

Season 5 (2008−09)

Season 6 (2010)

Season 7 (2012−13)

Season 8 (2014)

Season 9 (2016)

Season 10 (2018–19)

Season 11 (2020)

References

PBS original programming
2000 American television series debuts
2010s American documentary television series
American travel television series
Television shows set in Europe
First-run syndicated television programs in the United States
2020s American documentary television series
2020 American television series endings